Lindsay Weir may refer to:

 Lindsay Weir (Freaks and Geeks), fictional character Lindsay Weir
 Lindsay Weir (cricketer) (1908–2003), New Zealand cricketer